The San Diego Zoo is a zoo in Balboa Park, San Diego, California, housing 4000 animals of more than 650 species and subspecies on  of Balboa Park leased from the City of San Diego. Its parent organization, San Diego Zoo Wildlife Alliance, is a private nonprofit conservation organization, and has one of the largest zoological membership associations in the world, with more than 250,000 member households and 130,000 child memberships, representing more than a half million people.

The San Diego Zoo was a pioneer in the concept of open-air, cageless exhibits that recreate natural animal habitats. For decades, the zoo housed and successfully bred giant pandas, with the largest giant panda population outside China, before the pandas were repatriated to China in 2019.

With more than 4 million visitors in 2018, San Diego Zoo is the most visited zoo in the United States. Travelers have also cited it as one of the best zoos in the world. The San Diego Zoo is an accredited member of the Association of Zoos and Aquariums (AZA), the American Alliance of Museums (AAM), and the World Association of Zoos and Aquariums (WAZA). The San Diego Zoo Wildlife Alliance also operates the San Diego Zoo Safari Park.

History

The San Diego Zoo grew out of exotic animal exhibitions abandoned after the 1915 Panama-California Exposition. Dr. Harry M. Wegeforth founded the Zoological Society of San Diego, meeting October 2, 1916, which initially followed precedents set by the New York Zoological Society at the Bronx Zoo. He served as president of the society until 1941. A permanent tract of land in Balboa Park was set aside in August 1921; on the advice of the city attorney, it was agreed that the city would own all the animals and the zoo would manage them. The zoo began to move in the following year. In addition to the animals from the Exposition, the zoo acquired a menagerie from the defunct Wonderland Amusement Park. Ellen Browning Scripps financed a fence around the zoo so that it could begin charging an entrance fee to offset costs. The publication ZooNooz commenced in early 1925.

Animal collector Frank Buck went to work as director of the San Diego Zoo on June 13, 1923, signed to a three-year contract by Wegeforth. William T. Hornaday, director of the Bronx Zoo, had recommended Buck for the job, but Buck quickly clashed with the strong-willed Wegeforth and left the zoo after three months to return to animal collecting.

After several other equally short-lived zoo directors, Wegeforth appointed the zoo's bookkeeper, Belle Benchley, to the position of executive secretary, in effect zoo director; she was given the actual title of zoo director a few years later. She served as zoo director from 1925 until 1953. For most of that time she was the only female zoo director in the world. She was succeeded as director by Dr. Charles Schroeder.

The San Diego Zoo was a pioneer in building "cageless" exhibits. Wegeforth was determined to create moated exhibits from the start, and the first lion area at the San Diego Zoo without enclosing wires opened in 1922.

Until the 1960s, admission for children under 16 was free, regardless of whether they were accompanied by a paying adult.

The zoo's Center for Reproduction of Endangered Species (CRES) was founded in 1975 at the urging of Kurt Benirschke, who became its first director. CRES was renamed the division of Conservation and Research for Endangered Species in 2005 to better reflect its mission. In 2009, CRES was significantly expanded to become the Institute for Conservation Research.

The world's only albino koala in a zoological facility was born September 1, 1997, at the San Diego Zoo and was named Onya-Birri, which means "ghost boy" in an Australian Aboriginal language. The San Diego Zoo has the largest number of koalas outside of Australia.

In 2014, a colony of African penguins arrived for the first time in the zoo since 1979. They have since moved into Africa Rocks when it opened in 2017.

In 2016, Baba, the last pangolin on display in North America at the time, died at the zoo.

In October 2020, two gorillas charged at the glass of their enclosure, damaging the outer pane.

Escapes
The San Diego Zoo has had a number of notable escapees through the years; the most noteworthy of them is Ken Allen, a Bornean orangutan who came to be known as "the hairy Houdini", for his many escapes.

In 1940, a Malayan Tapir managed to escape several times, earning it the nickname "Terrible Trudy".

In 1977, an animal control officer for the County of San Diego, Tom Van Wagner, a previous employee of the San Diego Zoo as a tour bus guide, captured a Tasmanian devil escapee in a south central San Diego home's garage. The animal was transported to the zoo and the zoo hospital staff took possession of the capture.

In March 2013, the zoo, which was hosting a private party at the time, had to initiate a lockdown when two striped hyenas somehow got past their barriers. They were "darted with a sedative and taken to the veterinary care clinic."

In 2014, a koala named Mundu escaped to a neighboring tree just outside its Koalafornia Australia Outback enclosure. Zookeepers lured him down the tree once the park closed that day.

In early 2015, two Wolf's guenons monkeyed around outside of their Lost Forest enclosure after escaping. One of the monkeys neared a fence line off of Route 163, but was brought back to safety without injury.

Features

The zoo offers a guided tour bus that traverses 75% of the park. There is also an overhead gondola lift called the Skyfari, providing an aerial view of the zoo. The Skyfari was built in 1969 by the Von Roll tramway company of Bern, Switzerland. The San Diego Zoo Skyfari is a Von Roll type 101.

Exhibits at the zoo are often designed around a particular habitat. The same exhibit may feature many different animals that can be found side by side in the wild, along with native plant life. Exhibits range from an African rain forest (featuring gorillas) to the Arctic taiga and tundra in the summertime (featuring polar bears). Some of the largest free-flight aviaries in existence are here, including the Owens Aviary and the Scripps Aviary. Many exhibits are "natural", with invisible wires and darkened blinds (to view birds), and accessible pools and open-air moats (for large mammals).

The San Diego Zoo also operates the San Diego Zoo Safari Park, which displays animals in a more expansive, open setting than at the zoo. Animals are regularly exchanged between the two locations, as well as between San Diego Zoo and other zoos around the world, usually in accordance with Species Survival Plan recommendations. San Diego Zoo has one of the world's largest and most diverse animal collections; however, the number of animal species held has reduced over the past two decades from 860 to approximately 650. This comes as exhibits are redeveloped into larger, more natural displays, and as a number of animals are transitioned to San Diego Zoo Safari Park.

The temperate, sunny maritime climate of California is well suited to many plants and animals. Besides an extensive collection of birds, reptiles, and mammals, it also maintains its grounds as an arboretum, with a rare plant collection. The zoo is also an accredited botanical garden; the botanical collection includes more than 700,000 exotic plants. As part of its gardening effort, some rare animal foods are grown at the zoo. For example, 40 varieties of bamboo were raised for the pandas when they were at the zoo on long-term loan from China. It also maintains 18 varieties of eucalyptus trees to feed its koalas.

Keepers and most other employees at the San Diego Zoo are members of Teamsters Union Local 481.

Exhibits
The zoo is expected to open a new exhibit, the Sanford's Children Zoo, sometime in 2021.

Monkey Trail and Forest Tales
Monkey Trails showcases primates and other animals native to the tropical and semi-tropical rainforests of Asia and Africa. Opening in 2005, it replaced a decades-old area of exhibits known as Ape and Bird Mesa. These were some of the oldest animal "houses" still in use (at the time) at the San Diego Zoo, being built in the 1930s, with little to no change until demolition for Monkey Trails. In addition to a few small bird aviaries and a troop of siamang apes living on a treehouse in the center of a pond, the site was centered around two square buildings; these plain structures  contained many small exhibits lined up, one after another, on all four sides. One of the buildings was focused on monkeys, while the other was mainly songbirds, parrots, and tropical avian species. There had been a few efforts at landscaping these cages; however, the monkeys notably lived in bleak, "prison-cell" like cages. A number of Zoo members and guests left comments over the years regarding the exhibits and their lack of plant life, the (apparent) lack of enrichment for the monkeys and, mostly, the appearance of cement "cell blocks" as exhibits. The construction and debut of Monkey Trails and Forest Tails was undoubtedly a massive improvement, enriching for visitors but especially for the animals. 

Monkey Trails is home primarily to monkeys such as the Angolan colobus, lion-tailed macaque, tufted capuchin, red-tailed monkey, DeBrazza's monkey, spot-nosed guenon, Douc langur and a group of colorful mandrill. There is also a pair of pygmy hippopotamus named Elgon and Mabel, who share their underwater-viewing pond with a large school of African cichlids and tilapia. On April 9, 2020 (during  lockdown from COVID-19), after weeks of anticipation, Mabel gave birth to Akobi, a male calf. His birth marked the first pygmy hippo born at the zoo in nearly thirty years. They also share their enclosure with Wolf's mona monkeys. 

Throughout the walking paths, visitors can also see West African slender-snouted crocodiles, different species of turtle, snake, lizards, and various African freshwater fish; these different animals live in a series of densely-planted paludarium- and riparium-style exhibits, complete with thick glass panels for close-up animal encounters. In smaller vivarium and terrarium exhibits, other reptiles such as pancake tortoises, Gaboon vipers, puff adders and Schneider's skinks can be seen. Monkey Trails utilized a newer concept for the displaying of arboreal animals; by making the exhibits two storeys high,  with stairs, walkways and elevators for access, the habits of animals can be observed from ground level as well as from the treetops. Some of the horticultural highlights of Monkey Trails include several massive Banyan fig (Ficus) trees (viewable  in public areas as well as in animal exhibits), cycads, and a bog garden with Sarracenia, Drosera, Venus flytraps and other carnivorous plants.

Owens Aviary
The Owens Aviary contains about 200 individual tropical birds from around 45 species, mainly from Australasia, Oceania and Papua New Guinea. The aviary is built onto the side of an approx. 60' high canyon wall, being accessible via an entry/exit at the uppermost level and another at the lower end of the aviary (essentially the canyon floor). The walkway inside the aviary connects these entryways as it ascends and descends with the natural slope. The naturally steep location proves to be perfect for the exhibit's waterfall, which  cascades downhill through the aviary before splashing down into a large pond. The ambient white noise of the waterfall is quite noticeable, but relaxing and tranquil, rather than very loud. The waterfall churns up mist, and a cool steam fills the aviary with ambient humidity; additionally, the outside of the structure is painted a dark green color, which helps to block any excess sunlight from penetrating inside. This further gives visitors the feeling of walking through a lush, dense jungle. 

The entire aviary is lushly landscaped and thick with palms, ficus, Araceae species (such as Monstera deliciosa and Thaumatophyllum), Clivia sp., ferns and many more varieties. The varied collection of bird life includes the Chinese hwamei, eclectus parrot, black-naped fruit doves, common emerald doves, red-billed leiothrix, Victoria crowned pigeons, Bali myna, Nicobar pigeons, the blue-crowned laughingthrush, white-rumped shamas, the maleo, Himalayan monal and great argus pheasants.

Scripps Aviary
The Scripps Aviary was built in 1923 and is home to many colorful birds from Africa such as the violet-backed starling, African grey parrots, blue-bellied rollers, tambourine doves, great blue turacos, hamerkops, superb starlings, black-headed weavers, white-headed buffalo weavers, white-faced whistling ducks, African spoonbills, Madagascar crested ibises and southern bald ibises.

Parker Aviary
The Parker Aviary houses various birds from South America including Andean cock-of-the-rocks, blue-crowned motmots, blue-headed macaws, crested oropendola, Inca terns, keel-billed toucans, ringed teals, sunbitterns and toco toucans. It is situated next to a complex of 20 smaller aviaries previously known as Wings of Australasia, exhibiting tropical birds from Southeast Asia and the Pacific. San Diego Zoo has the largest collection of birds in North America. Together the zoo and San Diego Zoo Safari Park hold America's most diverse collection of hornbills, with 15 species displayed in 2014.

Panda Canyon
As of April 2019, the panda exhibit is not in operation. The zone was previously called Giant Panda Research Station. The pandas were repatriated to China after successfully serving the larger conservation effort for pandas.

In the past, the San Diego Zoo was one of four zoos in the U.S. which had giant pandas on display, and was the most successful in terms of panda reproduction. The first two giant panda cubs in U.S. history to have been born in the U.S. and survive into adulthood—Hua Mei (female, born to Bai Yun and Shi Shi) and Mei Sheng (male, born to Bai Yun and Gao Gao)—were born at the San Diego Zoo, in 1999 and 2003, respectively. After that, three more giant panda cubs—Su Lin and Zhen Zhen (both females) and Yun Zi (male)—were born to the resident giant panda parents Bai Yun and Gao Gao. Xiao Liwu (meaning "little gift"), was born on July 29, 2012, and was let outside for visitors to see on January 9, 2013. All of the cubs have since been sent back to China to participate in the breeding program there.

In addition to being able to view this rare animal species, the nearby Giant Panda Discovery Center had interactive exhibits that let the visitor experience firsthand what the animals smell and sound like. Since the closing of Panda Trek, there are now exhibits of other Chinese animals, including golden takin, red pandas, Mangshan pit vipers, and an exhibit comparing several types of bamboo. There is also a feline area,  featuring the critically endangered  Amur leopard and snow leopards. The leopards' enclosures are located on both sides of the public walkway, and are connected with elevated climbing tunnels which arch over visitors at a height of about 20'. In addition to perfect photo opportunities, this exhibit provides stimulating enrichment for the leopards, who can be seen patrolling the tunnels and people-watching from above. 

Throughout the 1980s, this part of the zoo also housed the first group of snub-nosed monkeys outside of their native China.

Urban Jungle

The Urban Jungle houses different animals including a small herd of Masai giraffes, Soemmerring's gazelles, American flamingos, a Grant's zebra, a miniature Mediterranean donkey and cheetahs. Many of the Zoo's animal ambassadors live there including a binturongs, fennec foxes, Cape porcupines, southern three-banded armadillos, and southern ground hornbills. The giraffes living here are on what was Elephant Mesa. There is also a theater where the zoo has its "Animals in Action" show.

Polar Bear Plunge
Polar Bear Plunge, which opened in 1996, and was renovated in March 2010, houses over 30 species representing the Arctic. The main animals in the area are the three polar bears, named Kalluk, Chinook, and Tatqiq. More animals that make their home in the Plunge include reindeer (or caribou), Canada lynx and black-billed magpies. An underwater viewing area is available to observe the polar bears swimming in their  pool.

Farther down the path lies the arctic aviary, home to diving ducks including buffleheads, harlequin ducks, redheads, smews, Eurasian wigeons, northern pintails, canvasbacks, mallards, cinnamon teals, hooded mergansers and ruddy ducks. The aviary houses more than 25 species of duck. Some of the horticultural highlights include giant redwood trees, many different pine trees, and manzanita.

Just up the path of Polar Bear Plunge is Northwest passage, housing mountain lions, maned wolves, Patagonian maras, giant anteaters, gerenuk, bontebok, Grévy's zebras, lesser kudu, Speke's gazelles, Chacoan peccaries, as well as the Eagle Canyon, home to Andean condors, harpy eagles, ornate hawk eagles and Steller's sea eagles.

Wildlife Explorers Basecamp
The San Diego Zoo spreads the word of animal conservation through education. The zoo has added a new exhibit called The Wildlife Explorers Basecamp. It has lots of new animals that kids would not normally be able to interact with. This can include prairie dogs, axolotls, or alligators. Kids can learn about these animals, play in the water fountain, climb the tree house, or scramble through the play areas. The zoo wants to provide active thinking through these activities to benefit the animals. There are 4 main zones in the basecamp that feature wildlife that live in the 4 main ecosystems: Desert Dunes, Wild Woods, Marsh Meadows, and The Rainforest.

The Wildlife Explorers Basecamp is located in the southeastern corner of the zoo, near the entrance. It is where the reptile house is located along with the new reptile walk. Inside is the children's zoo and the Discovery Playground.

There is a petting zoo, called the petting paddock, which is home to different breeds of sheep and goats. This is where people, mostly kids, can have more interaction with the animals. There is also a Fisher-Price Discovery Playground, perfect for kids who want to have some fun and play. The children's zoo is under renovation along with the Komodo dragon and hummingbird exhibits.

Other animals in the Children's Zoo include great horned owls, black-tailed prairie dogs, burrowing owls, naked mole rats, fennec foxes, South American coatis, common squirrel monkeys, Burmese star tortoises, southern tamanduas and prehensile-tailed porcupines.

Hummingbird Habitat
A small aviary that includes 3 species of hummingbirds, the Anna's, Costa's, and Honduran emerald hummingbirds, along with golden-collared manakins, various tanagers, violaceous euphonias, purple honeycreepers and spangled cotingas.

Spineless Marvels
The zoo's insect house with an insect collection including live insects: Central American giant cave cockroaches, Madagascar hissing cockroaches, leafcutter ants, Goliath beetles, giant dead leaf mantises, ghost mantises, two-spotted assassin bugs, giant African millipedes, giant desert hairy scorpions, golden silk orb-weavers, Antilles pinktoe tarantulas, Brazilian black tarantulas, Mexican fireleg tarantulas, golden-eyed stick insects, goliath stick insects, jungle nymphs, thorny devil stick insects and western honey bees.

Cool Critters
This building houses fish, invertebrates, reptiles and amphibians. Some of the species housed here are axolotl, Chinese giant salamanders, Cuvier's dwarf caimans, eastern hooded scaly-foot, leopard geckos, Indonesian blue-tongued skinks, common chuckwallas, yellow-spotted river turtles, freshwater angelfish, giant danios, pinktail chalceus, threadfin acara, multiple Lake Malawi cichlids, South American lungfish and sunburst diving beetles.

Reptile Walk
Previously called Reptile Mesa, the Reptile Walk houses small outdoor yards, one housing European species like European pond turtles, marginated tortoises, scheltopusiks and ocellated lizards while the other contains African species, radiated tortoises, Sudan plated lizards and yellow-throated plated lizards.

Walking down the path leads to a building split in two. One side contains terrariums for amphibians such as the Amazon milk frog, Panamanian golden frog, brown mantella, magnificent tree frog, fire salamander, Kaiser's mountain newt and many species of poison dart frog including the dyeing poison dart frog, green and black poison dart frog, black-legged poison frog and splashback poison frog. The other side contains native Californian species like the Colorado River toad, California kingsnake, coastal rosy boa, Baja California rat snake, San Diego gopher snake and giant horned lizard.

The walkway then passes an enclosure for the endangered Chinese alligator and afterwards is a building housing turtles, including broad-shelled river turtles, Roti Island snake-necked turtles, Argentine snake-necked turtles, red-headed Amazon River turtles, Malayan snail-eating turtles, Parker's snake-necked turtles, mata mata and pig-nosed turtles.

Nearby is the gharial pond. Various turtles like Indian flapshell turtles, Indian narrow-headed softshell turtles, northern river terrapins, painted terrapins and others are also housed with the gharials.

Concluding the Reptile Walk are yards housing Asian forest tortoises, African spurred tortoises, Grand Cayman blue iguanas, Jamaican iguanas- Galápagos tortoises and leopard tortoises.

Reptile House
This is a renowned Spanish-influence structure. Animals at the reptile house and green anacondas, king cobras, Chinese crocodile lizards, black-headed bushmasters, northern caiman lizards, emerald tree monitors, Fiji banded iguanas, banded water cobras, Boelen's pythons, green tree pythons, western green mamba, woma pythons, eastern diamondback rattlesnakes, Santa Catalina rattlesnakes, western diamondback rattlesnakes, side-striped palm-pit vipers, eyelash vipers, Ethiopian mountain vipers, West African Gaboon vipers, Malagasy ground boas, flower snakes, Argus monitors, Merten's water monitors, pancake tortoise, Gila monster, Mexican beaded lizards, Philippine sailfin lizards, shingleback skinks, prehensile-tailed skinks, along with various other species.

Lost Forest
Based upon the real Ituri Forest in the Democratic Republic of the Congo in the central part of the continent of Africa, this exhibit opened in 1999 as 'Ituri Forest' and houses different animal species from the rainforests of central Africa. The exhibit begins with a forested exhibit for okapi and black duiker, then winds past a recreation of two-leaf-covered Mbuti huts with signage about the people's customs and traditions. Next, the path leads to the hippopotamus exhibit housing two hippopotamus named Funani and her daughter Amahle, which also houses tilapia, and has an underwater viewing area. After the hippos, the path passes through a bunch of bamboo before reaching a clearing where aviaries have housed emerald starlings and other species. A thatched-roof gift shop and a food stand are located in a plaza near by. Immediately to the right is the red river hog exhibit, which also houses De Brazza's monkey, Allen's swamp monkey, the red-tailed monkey and the spotted-necked otter. The plaza leads to a bridge flanked by the red river hog exhibit on one side and an exhibit that only the small monkeys and otters can access on the other. Across the bridge is a creek where the otters can swim, with viewing both above and below the water's surface. Afterwards, the path joins the rest of the zoo.

Elephant Odyssey

This exhibit opened on May 23, 2009, on the site of the former Hoof and Horn Mesa area, and was met with mixed reviews. The main feature of the exhibit is the  elephant habitat—more than three times the size of the zoo's former elephant exhibit Elephant Mesa (now the "Urban Jungle" exhibit area). Currently a herd of five, the herd includes three females and two twin brothers. It consists of a blended herd of three African bush elephants named Shaba, two new juveniles from the San Diego Zoo Safari Park and Reid Park Zoo named Tsandizkle and Inhlonipho, and two Asian elephants named Devi and Mary. Elephant Odyssey also features a glimpse of the past, with the Fossil Portal and life-size statues of ancient creatures of Southern California next to exhibits of their modern-day counterparts. The ancient life represented include the Columbian mammoth, the saber-toothed cat, the American lion, the Daggett's eagle, a Merriam's teratorn, the dwarf pronghorn, the dire wolf, the short-faced bear and the Jefferson's ground sloth. Elephant Odyssey's other animal exhibits include lions, jaguars, Baird's tapirs, capybaras, pronghorns, Linnaeus's two-toed sloths, Kirk's dik-diks, secretary birds, black-billed magpies, dung beetles, three species of rattlesnakes, desert tarantulas, toads, newts, frogs, dromedary camels, horses, burros, guanacos, llamas, western pond turtles, common ravens and California condors. The zoo's formerly extensive ungulate collection was significantly reduced with the demolition of Horn and Hoof Mesa.  

The Fossil Portal is an artificial tar pit that periodically drains to reveal man-made Pleistocene-era bones. The path turns a corner and opens up at the Mammoth Passage Plaza, with exhibits for jaguars and lions which has a lion exhibit to the left which houses a lion named Ernest and a lioness named Miss Ellen, as well as an exhibit that has houses two-toed sloths to the right, and the tip of the elephant exhibit, with a large wading pool, straight ahead. The path continues to the left along with the pool, passing by the jaguar exhibit on the left. The northern end of the elephant pool drains into the mixed-species exhibit, which houses Baird's tapirs, capybaras, guanacos, and llamas. The path meets up with the elephant exhibit again before it reaches the Elephant Care Center, where visitors can watch keepers care for the pachyderms. Next is an exhibit for secretarybirds with grasses, a tree, and a statue of the extinct Daggett's eagle nearby. Afterward, the path goes down a crevasse with a wall embedded with vivaria for dung beetles and diving beetles, among other aquatic insects. The path tunnels below the elephant exhibit to reach the other side, where it continues between the elephant exhibit and a creek for native reptiles and amphibians. Just past the source of the stream is a restaurant and gift shop, and after that are exhibits for pronghorns, horses, and camels. Next the path splits between a playground, a rattlesnake terrarium, and a California condor aviary with artificial rock spires and a stream. The paths then reunite and join the rest of the zoo.

Gorilla Tropics

Simulating the rainforests of central Africa, and opened in 1991, Gorilla Tropics has an  enclosure for the eponymous species. The exhibit has waterfalls, a meadow, and tropical plants such as allspice, coral trees, and African tulip trees, as well as several species of bamboo. Guests can view the six western lowland gorillas, which are a family group consisting of Paul Donn, Jessica and their son Denny as well as a bachelor group consisting of three males named Ekuba, Maka and Mandazzi from a viewing window, across a waterfall, and across a creek. Nearby are the bonobo habitat, an enclosure for black crested mangabeys, an aviary housing crowned eagles and a small glass aviary by the bonobos housing a variety of smaller birds like exclamatory paradise whydahs, purple grenadiers, Red-billed firefinches, red-cheeked cordon-bleus, zebra waxbills and more. There is also a row of other mesh aviaries which include more birds like three species of bird-of-paradise, the Raggiana bird-of-paradise, magnificent bird-of-paradise, superb bird-of-paradise alongside others like Bali mynas, crested wood partridges, red-tailed black cockatoos, tricolored parrotfinch, mountain peacock-pheasants, western crowned pigeons, beautiful fruit doves, Guam kingfishers, Mindanao bleeding-hearts and blue-crowned lorikeets.

Absolutely Apes

This exhibit opened in 2003, as a major renovation of the former "Whittier Southeast Asian Exhibits", which had opened in 1982. It houses three female Sumatran orangutans and one male infant named Karen, Indah, Aisha and Kaja (a Bornean orangutan was also kept here; Aisha and Kaja are the offspring of Indah) and even three siamangs named Unkie, Eloise and their daughter Selamat in an  exhibit, which is flanked by a  glass viewing window. The exhibit provides sway poles and artificial trees for the apes to swing on and a fake termite mound for them to fish condiments out of. The viewing area is designed to resemble the mulch-lined exhibit side of the viewing window by having rubber mulch, and miniature sway poles for kids. Some plant species in the exhibit are toog trees, carrotwood trees, and markhamia trees. Silvered leaf monkeys also reside in this area.

Sun Bear Forest
This $3.5 million exhibit opened in 1989, and exhibits Bornean sun bears, Angola colobus and François' langurs. One end of the  complex houses lion-tailed macaques in a grassy exhibit with a stream and climbing ropes. The oblong sun bear exhibit straddles the path along the rest of the complex, and an aviary houses some species of birds, including Asian fairy-bluebird and Red-billed leiothrix. A large glass-covered exhibit with artificial vines is designed for crested gibbons. Farther down the path, visitors can see grizzly bears, sloth bears, spectacled bears, North American river otters and aye-ayes.

Tiger Trail
Tiger Trail, located in a sloping canyon, opened in 1988 and houses three male Malayan tigers named Conner, the eldest, and Cinta and Berani, the twins, they are all brothers. From the top of the canyon, the path first goes through a pavilion with a pool home to Siamese crocodiles. It proceeds to another pavilion, this time flanked by the a bunch of aviaries which feature Asian fairy-bluebirds, Baikal teals, blue-crowned laughingthrushes, Edwards's pheasants, common emerald doves, tricolored parrotfinch, red-billed leiothrix, and there are also exhibits for fishing cats and the rare coconut crabs. Farther down the canyon is an exhibit for the Malayan tapir, North Sulawesi babirusas, Indian rock pythons and the  tiger habitat, which has a hillside stream, waterfall, and glass viewing window. 

The Tiger Trail area of the zoo, when dedicated in 1988 as 'Tiger River', replaced an exhibit area that was known as Cascade Canyon, which had opened in 1973.

Outback

A new Australian Outback area, nicknamed "Koalafornia", opened in May 2013. The San Diego Zoo has the largest Koala colony outside of Australia. It has twice as much exhibit space for koalas, including more outdoor enclosures based on a realization that koalas need sun exposure for their health. The new area includes other Australian marsupials, such as brush-tailed bettongs, parma wallabies, as well as Australasian birds, such as kagus, laughing kookaburras, blue-faced honeyeaters, common emerald doves, fawn-breasted bowerbirds, metallic starlings, masked lapwings, Gouldian finches and palm cockatoos. Since October 2013, the exhibit also houses Tasmanian devils, the first American zoo to do so; the animals are now kept in half a dozen zoos in the Americas as part of the Australian government's Save the Tasmanian Devil Program.

Africa Rocks
Conrad Prebys's Africa Rocks highlights the biodiversity of Africa. The exhibit opened on July 1, 2017, but was not completed until December 6, 2017. The exhibit cost US$60 million to construct. The money was donated to the zoo by 3,800 donors. Africa Rocks replaced Dog and Cat Canyon, which featured grottos that were built in the 1930s.

The exhibit features the following six habitats:

Cape Fynbos

The Cape Fynbos exhibit features African penguins, an endangered species native to South Africa. The exhibit was designed to mimic the giant granite boulders that are found on Boulders Beach in South Africa, a place where these birds live. Along with the large pool, the exhibit features a cobblestone beach and a nesting area. A group of 20 penguins moved in on June 22, 2017, to get ready for when the exhibit opened on July 1, 2017.

The penguins also share their exhibit with leopard sharks and opaleyes. Twelve leopard sharks arrived at the San Diego Zoo on June 23, 2017, from SeaWorld San Diego. The sharks were introduced to their exhibit and their penguin neighbors on Wednesday, June 28, 2017. The sharks range in age from 5 to 20. African penguins do not live alongside leopard sharks in the wild; however, they do live with similar shark species. Leopard sharks feed on crustaceans on the bottom floor and do not pose a threat to the penguins.

Acacia Woodland

The Acacia Woodland exhibit features a leopard exhibit, a troop of vervet monkeys, and an aviary. The leopard exhibit does not feature the African subspecies of leopard, but rather exhibiting the Amur leopards, from as far as Russia to Northern China. This is due to the fact that the Amur leopard is critically endangered, as there are only around 60 individuals left in the wild. The San Diego Zoo participates in the Amur leopard Species Survival Plan, a breeding program that focuses on preserving the genetics of this endangered cat. The Acacia Woodland exhibit will allow the Zoo to have more breeding spaces for the cats. The Zoo has a spotted and a black leopard.

Along with the leopard exhibit, the Acacia Woodland exhibit in Africa Rocks features a vervet monkey troop. The vervet monkeys are very agile and one of the only primate species that lives in a woodland habitat. The aviary in this exhibit features two species of bee eaters, the white-fronted and white-throated, as well as white-headed buffalo weavers and several other bird species. The exhibit also features African silverbills, African pygmy geese, violet-backed starlings, splendid sunbirds, blue-naped mousebirds, common waxbills, emerald-spotted wood doves, golden-breasted starlings, exclamatory paradise whydahs, magpie mannikins, Namaqua doves, pin-tailed whydahs, purple grenadiers, red-billed firefinches, red-cheeked cordon-bleus, snowy-crowned robin-chats, village indigobirds, white-bellied go-away-birds, white-headed buffalo weavers, yellow-crowned bishops, yellow-mantled widowbirds, and zebra waxbills. There are also Mozambique girdled lizards in the aviary.

Madagascar Forest

The Madagascar Forest exhibit features lemur species that the Association of Zoos and Aquariums' (AZA) Prosimian Taxon Advisory Group (TAG) has identified as needing sustainability assistance for the North American population. By building this new exhibit, the Zoo will be able to participate in breeding programs that will help ensure healthy populations of lemurs in zoos. The exhibit houses a ring-tailed lemur family consisting of mom Tweena, dad Mathew, and their baby Bijou along with five other ring-tailed lemurs. The red ruffed lemurs, one of the most endangered primates in the world, include mom Mortica and her baby Ony (Malagasy for "river"). The Zoo is hoping their collared brown lemur pair Pierre and Zaza will produce offspring. Aykroyd and Belushi, two male blue-eyed black lemurs, are still awaiting mates. Ared collard, lemurgrippina, and Thrax are Coquerel's sifakas, the final lemur species exhibited in Africa Rocks. Some of the lemur species will be exhibited together even if they do not live with each other in the wild.

Along with lemurs, the Madagascar Forest exhibit houses the lemurs' main predator the fossa as well as the honey badger.

Ethiopian Highlands

The Ethiopian Highlands exhibit houses two primate species: the gelada and the Hamadryas baboon. The San Diego Zoo is only the second zoo in North America to house geladas, the other facility being the Bronx Zoo in New York City. Alpha male Juma leads the all-male members including Mahbub, Saburi, Abasi, Diwani, and Valentino. the group arrived at the Zoo on September 7, 2016, from the Wilhelma Zoo in Stuttgart, Germany where they lived with 44 other geladas. This move was based by the European Association of Zoos and Aquariums' (EAZA) European Endangered Species Programme (EEP) for geladas—the European equivalent of an Association of Zoos and Aquariums' (AZA) Species Survival Plan (SSP) program. The bachelor group will be introduced to females later on.

The Ethiopian Highlands exhibit is also home to a troop of Nubian ibex.

Kopje Woodland

The word kopje in Dutch means "small head" which describes the rock formations that seem to pop out in the savanna. Kopjes are homes for well adapted animals. The San Diego Zoo's Kopje Woodland in Africa Rocks is home to animals including klipspringers, rock hyraxes, and the dwarf mongoose. Each animal has well adapted feet that allow them to cling to the rocks. The exhibit also includes southern ground hornbills and bateleur eagles, as well as meerkats, servals, trumpeter hornbills and the red-leaved rock fig, a tree species that manages to grow wherever its seeds disperse including the rocky kopje.

West African Forest

The West African Forest exhibits the dwarf crocodile. The west African exhibit also features Madagascan big-headed turtles, West African mud turtles, and the floating fig tree.

All the exhibits  house many rare and endangered species.

Conservation
The zoo is active in conservation and species-preservation efforts. Its Institute for Conservation Research (formerly the Center for Reproduction of Endangered Species) raises California condors, tigers, black rhinos, polar bears, orangutans, peninsular pronghorn, desert tortoises, African penguins, mountain yellow-legged frogs, Pacific pocket mice, caracals, dholes, Francois' langurs, giraffes, quino checkerspot butterflies, Hawaiian crows, gray wolves, light-footed clapper rails, Gray's monitors, tree lobsters, clouded leopards, Galapagos tortoises, Tahiti lorikeets, lion-tailed macaques, mhorr gazelles, gorillas, Przewalski's horses, koalas, burrowing owls, elephants, African wild dogs, ocelots, Tasmanian devils, okapi, raccoons, Southwestern pond turtles, bisons, Pallas's cats, and 145 other endangered species. As a result, they have reintroduced more than 30 endangered species back into the wild, and have conserved habitat at 50 field sites. They also have over 200 conservation scientists working in 35 countries around the world. It employs numerous professional geneticists, cytologists, and veterinarians and maintains a cryopreservation facility for rare sperm and eggs called the frozen zoo.

The San Diego Zoo Institute for Conservation Research is the largest zoo-based multidisciplinary research effort in the world. Based at the Arnold and Mabel Beckman Center for Conservation Research adjacent to the San Diego Zoo Safari Park, more than 200 dedicated scientists carry out research vital to the conservation of animals, plants, and habitats, locally and internationally.

Zoo Corps
Zoo Corps is a volunteer program at the San Diego Zoo that enlists high school students to teach guests at the zoo about the animals they are seeing and their place in the ecosystem. It enrolls students between 13 and 17 years of age. The goals are to promote public education about animals and conservation, and to help the students develop their ability to speak in public. The program runs year round in two sessions, one from May through November and one from January through May. Members of the Zoo Corps are expected to volunteer at least once a month.

The program utilizes a series of "Kits", which are set on tables throughout the zoo. The kits contain objects that can be used to explain why an animal is endangered or to shed light on the animal's lifestyle. The four kits are "Backyard Habitats", "Saving Species", "Animal Care", and "Sustainability".

Architecture
Local architect Louis John Gill designed the original buildings, cages and animal grottos and later in 1926, the Spanish Revival-style research hospital, for which Gill received an Honor Award from the San Diego Chapter of the American Institute of Architects. Gill also designed a bird cage at the zoo in 1937, then the largest bird cage in the world.

Awards 
The San Diego Zoo has received numerous awards for its exhibits, programs, and reproduction and conservation efforts. This list includes only awards given to the Zoo specifically, not to its parent organization; for those, see: San Diego Zoo Wildlife Alliance Awards.

In popular culture
 
 The very first and oldest surviving YouTube video, Me at the zoo, was shot in San Diego Zoo and was uploaded to YouTube on April 23, 2005, by the website's co-founder, Jawed Karim. It can still be viewed on YouTube. A marker was placed near the elephant exhibit to commemorate this upload.
 Birding writer Janann K. Jenner wrote a novel called Sandeagozu in 1986, in which animal characters seek the Zoo as a mythical semi-paradise.
 The shots of the private zoo at Xanadu in Orson Welles' 1941 film Citizen Kane were filmed at the San Diego Zoo.
 The San Diego Zoo was the filming location for the long-running documentary television series Zoorama.
 The San Diego Zoo, along with the St. Louis Zoo, were frequently mentioned in the Yogi Bear series of media as possible destinations Ranger Smith may ship Yogi to if he caused too much trouble at Jellystone Park. In the 1964 film Hey There, It's Yogi Bear!, Yogi was actually shipped to the San Diego Zoo, and his escape from being shipped off forms the plot of the film.
 In addition to its normal publicity efforts, and web page, the zoo also produced a short TV program for a number of years with Joan Embery. Joan Embery brought various animals to The Tonight Show Starring Johnny Carson between 1971 and 1987, and more recently (between 1993 and 2008) The Tonight Show with Jay Leno. The zoo loaned the animals.
 The zoo was featured prominently in the 2004 movie Anchorman: The Legend of Ron Burgundy, though filming was done at the old Los Angeles Zoo, not at the San Diego Zoo.
 The zoo is featured in the 1979 film Scavenger Hunt, in which each of the five teams in a scavenger hunt steals an ostrich from the zoo. (Actual ostriches were not used.)
 The front cover of The Beach Boys' 1966 album Pet Sounds was photographed at the San Diego Zoo.
 The 6ths' first album Wasps' Nests includes a song called "San Diego Zoo", which features comprehensive directions on how to get to the zoo.

See also

 Bai Yun, a giant panda formerly housed at the San Diego Zoo
 Panda diplomacy

References

Further reading
 Abrams, H., 1983. A World of Animals. (California: The Zoological Society of San Diego)
 
 
 Greeley, M., et al. 1997. The San Diego Zoo. (California: Craftsman Press)
 
 
 Uddin, Lisa. Zoo Renewal: White Flight and the Animal Ghetto (2015) focus on San Diego zoo; excerpt
 Wegeforth, H.M. & Morgan, N. 1953. It Began with a Roar: the Beginning of the World-Famous San Diego Zoo (revised edition). (California: Crest Offset Printing Company)

External links

 
 PBS Nature: San Diego Zoo
 Balboa Park
 YouTube channel

 
Zoos in California
1916 establishments in California
Parks in San Diego
Zoo
Landmarks in San Diego
Zoos established in 1916